Sonprayag is a village in the Rudraprayag district of Uttarakhand state in India. Approx. 73 Kilometres from Rudraprayag Town, the district headquarter. Situated on the banks of river Mandakini River, it is a proposed Y-forked railway junction on Chota Char Dham Railway for two different railways going to Kedarnath and Badrinath.

Geography
Nearby are Kedarnath and Badrinath, the holiest places of Hinduism called Chota Char Dham.

Transport
It is a terminating junction on the Karanprayag-Saikot-Sonprayag Kedarnath Railway route of Chota Char Dham Railway.

Demographics
 India census, village has a small population.

References

External links

 Chamoli District Map

Cities and towns in Chamoli district